National Geographic (formerly the National Geographic Magazine, sometimes branded as NAT GEO) is an American monthly magazine published by National Geographic Partners.

The magazine was founded in 1888 as a scholarly journal, nine months after the establishment of the society, but is now a popular magazine. In 1905, it began including pictures, a style for which it became well-known. Its first color photos appeared in the 1910s. During the Cold War, the magazine committed itself to present a balanced view of the physical and human geography of countries beyond the Iron Curtain. Later, the magazine became outspoken on environmental issues. Since 2019, controlling interest has been held by The Walt Disney Company.

Topics of features generally concern geography, history, nature, science, and world culture. The magazine is well known for its distinctive appearance: a thick square-bound glossy format with a yellow rectangular border. Map supplements from National Geographic Maps are included with subscriptions. It is available in a traditional printed edition and an interactive online edition.

, the magazine had won 25 National Magazine Awards.

History

The first issue of the National Geographic Magazine was published on September 22, 1888, nine months after the Society was founded. It was initially a scholarly journal sent to 165 charter members; currently, it reaches the hands of 40 million people each month. Starting with its January 1905 publication of several full-page pictures of Tibet in 1900–01, the magazine  from being a text-oriented publication to featuring extensive pictorial content. By 1908 more than half of the magazine's pages were photographs. The June 1985 cover portrait of a 12-year-old Afghan girl Sharbat Gula, shot by photographer Steve McCurry, became one of the magazine's most recognizable images.

National Geographic Kids, the children's version of the magazine, was launched in 1975 under the name National Geographic World.

In the late 1990s, the magazine began publishing The Complete National Geographic, an electronic compendium of every past issue of the magazine. It was then sued over copyright of the magazine as a collective work in Greenberg v. National Geographic and other cases, and temporarily withdrew the compilation. The magazine eventually prevailed in the dispute, and in July 2009 resumed publishing all past issues through December 2008. More recent issues were later added to the collection; the archive and electronic edition of the magazine are available online to the magazine's subscribers.

In September 2015, the National Geographic Society moved the magazine to National Geographic Partners, in which 21st Century Fox held a 73% controlling interest. In December 2017, a deal was announced for Disney to acquire 21st Century Fox, including the interest in National Geographic Partners. The acquisition was completed in March 2019. NG Media publishing unit was operationally transferred into Disney Publishing Worldwide.

Administration

Editors-in-chief
The magazine had a single "editor" from 1888 to 1920. From 1920 to 1967, the chief editorship was held by the president of the National Geographic Society. Since 1967, the magazine has been overseen by its own "editor" and/or "editor-in-chief". The list of editors-in-chief includes three generations of the Grosvenor family between 1903 and 1980.

John Hyde: (October 1888 – September 1900; Editor-in-Chief: September 1900 – February 1903)
Gilbert Hovey Grosvenor (1875–1966): (Editor-in-Chief: February 1903 – January 1920; Managing Editor: September 1900 – February 1903; Assistant Editor: May 1899 – September 1900)
Gilbert Hovey Grosvenor: (1920–1954) (president of the society and editor-in-chief at the same time)
John Oliver La Gorce (1879–1959): (May 1954 – January 1957) (president of the society at the same time)
Melville Bell Grosvenor (1901–1982): (January 1957 – August 1967) (president of the society at the same time) (thereafter editor-in-chief to 1977)
Frederick Vosburgh (1905–2005): (August 1967 – October 1970)
Gilbert Melville Grosvenor (born 1931): (October 1970 – July 1980) (then became president of the society)
Wilbur E. Garrett: (July 1980 – April 1990)
William Graves: (April 1990 – December 1994)
William L. Allen: (January 1995 – January 2005)
Chris Johns: (January 2005 – April 2014) (first "editor-in-chief" since MBG)
Susan Goldberg:  (April 2014 – April 2022)
Nathan Lump: (May 2022 – present)

Articles
During the Cold War, the magazine committed itself to present a balanced view of the physical and human geography of countries beyond the Iron Curtain.  The magazine printed articles on Berlin, de-occupied Austria, the Soviet Union, and Communist China that deliberately downplayed politics to focus on culture. In its coverage of the Space Race, National Geographic focused on the scientific achievement while largely avoiding reference to the race's connection to nuclear arms buildup. There were also many articles in the 1930s, 1940s and 1950s about the individual states and their resources, along with supplementary maps of each state. Many of these articles were written by longtime staff such as Frederick Simpich. There were also articles about biology and science topics.

In later years, articles became outspoken on issues such as environmental issues, deforestation, chemical pollution, global warming, and endangered species. Series of articles were included focusing on the history and varied uses of specific products such as a single metal, gem, food crop, or agricultural product, or an archaeological discovery. Occasionally an entire month's issue would be devoted to a single country, past civilization, a natural resource whose future is endangered, or other themes. In recent decades, the National Geographic Society has unveiled other magazines with different focuses. Whereas the magazine featured lengthy expositions in the past, recent issues have shorter articles.

Photography

In addition to being well known for articles about scenery, history, and the most distant corners of the world, the magazine has been recognized for its book-like quality and its standard of photography. It was during the tenure of Society President Alexander Graham Bell and editor Gilbert H. Grosvenor (GHG) that the significance of illustration was first emphasized, in spite of criticism from some of the Board of Managers who considered the many illustrations an indicator of an “unscientific” conception of geography. By 1910, photographs had become the magazine's trademark and Grosvenor was constantly on the search for "dynamical pictures" as Graham Bell called them, particularly those that provided a sense of motion in a still image. In 1915, GHG began building the group of staff photographers and providing them with advanced tools including the latest darkroom.

The magazine began to feature some pages of color photography in the early 1930s, when this technology was still in its early development. During the mid-1930s, Luis Marden (1913–2003), a writer and photographer for National Geographic, convinced the magazine to allow its photographers to use the so-called "miniature" 35 mm Leica cameras loaded with Kodachrome film over bulkier cameras with heavy glass plates that required the use of tripods. In 1959, the magazine started publishing small photographs on its covers, later becoming larger photographs.  National Geographic photography quickly shifted to digital photography for both its printed magazine and its website. In subsequent years, the cover, while keeping its yellow border, shed its oak leaf trim and bare table of contents, to allow for a full page photograph taken for one of the month's articles. Issues of National Geographic are often kept by subscribers for years and re-sold at thrift stores as collectibles. The standard for photography has remained high over the subsequent decades and the magazine is still illustrated with some of the highest-quality photojournalism in the world. In 2006, National Geographic began an international photography competition, with over eighteen countries participating.

In conservative Muslim countries like Iran and Malaysia, photographs featuring topless or scantily clad members of primitive tribal societies are often blacked out; buyers and subscribers often complain that this practice decreases the artistic value of the photographs for which National Geographic is known.

Gallery

Map supplements
Supplementing the articles, the magazine sometimes provides maps of the regions visited.

National Geographic Maps (originally the Cartographic Division) became a division of the National Geographic Society in 1915. The first supplement map, which appeared in the May 1918 issue of the magazine, titled The Western Theatre of War, served as a reference for overseas military personnel and soldiers' families alike. On some occasions, the Society's map archives have been used by the United States government in instances where its own cartographic resources were limited. President Franklin D. Roosevelt's White House map room was filled with National Geographic maps. A National Geographic map of Europe is featured in the displays of the Winston Churchill museum in London showing Churchill's markings at the Yalta Conference where the Allied leaders divided post-war Europe.

In 2001, National Geographic released an eight-CD-ROM set containing all its maps from 1888 to December 2000. Printed versions are also available from the National Geographic website.

Language editions

In April 1995, National Geographic began publishing in Japanese, its first local language edition. The magazine is currently published in 29 local editions around the world.

The following local-language editions have been discontinued:

In association with Trends Publications in Beijing and IDG Asia, National Geographic has been authorized for "copyright cooperation" in China to publish the yellow-border magazine, which launched with the July 2007 issue of the magazine with an event in Beijing on July 10, 2007, and another event on December 6, 2007, in Beijing also celebrating the 29th anniversary of normalization of U.S.–China relations featuring former President Jimmy Carter. The mainland China version is one of the two local-language editions that bump the National Geographic logo off its header in favor of a local-language logo; the other one is the Persian version published under the name Gita Nama.

Worldwide editions are sold on newsstands in addition to regular subscriptions. In several countries, such as Hungary, Slovenia, Croatia, Turkey and Ukraine National Geographic paved the way for a subscription model in addition to traditional newsstand sales.In the United States, newsstand sales began in 1998; previously, membership in the National Geographic Society was the only way to receive the magazine.

Awards
On May 1, 2008, National Geographic won three National Magazine Awards—an award solely for its written content—in the reporting category for an article by Peter Hessler on the Chinese economy; an award in the photojournalism category for work by John Stanmeyer on malaria in the Third World; and a prestigious award for general excellence.

Between 1980 and 2011 the magazine has won a total of 24 National Magazine Awards.

In May 2006, 2007, and 2011 National Geographic magazine won the American Society of Magazine Editors' General Excellence Award in the over two million circulation category. In 2010, National Geographic Magazine received the top ASME awards for photojournalism and essay. In 2011, National Geographic Magazine received the top-award from ASME—the Magazine of the Year Award.

In April 2014, National Geographic received the National Magazine Award ("Ellie") for best tablet edition for its multimedia presentation of Robert Draper's story "The Last Chase," about the final days of a tornado researcher who was killed in the line of duty.

In February 2017, National Geographic received the National Magazine Award ("Ellie") for best website. National Geographic won the 2020 Webby Award for News & Magazines in the category Apps, Mobile & Voice. National Geographic won the 2020 Webby Award and Webby People's Voice Award for Magazine in the category Web.

Controversies
On the magazine's February 1982 cover, the pyramids of Giza were altered, resulting in the first major scandal of the digital photography age and contributing to photography's "waning credibility".

The cover of the October 1988 issue featured a photo of a large ivory male portrait whose authenticity, particularly the alleged Ice Age provenance, has been questioned.

In 1999, the magazine was embroiled in the Archaeoraptor scandal, in which it purported to have a fossil linking birds to dinosaurs. The fossil was a forgery.

In 2010, the magazine's Your Shot competition was awarded to American filmmaker and photographer William Lascelles for a photograph presented as a portrait of a dog with fighter jets flying over its shoulder. Will Lascelles had, in reality, created the image using photo editing software.

In March 2018, the editor of National Geographic, Susan Goldberg, said that historically the magazine's coverage of people around the world had been racist. Goldberg stated that the magazine ignored non-white Americans and showed different groups as exotic, thereby promoting racial clichés.

See also

 Areography (geography of Mars)
 African Geographical Review
 American Association of Geographers
 Annals of the American Association of Geographers
 Antipode
 Asian Geographic
 Australian Geographic
 Canadian Geographic and Géographica in Canada
 Cartography
 Chinese National Geography (founded in 1949)
 Chris Johns (photographer), staff photographer and subsequently, editor-in-chief (2005–2014) of the magazine
 Gamma Theta Upsilon
 GEO, Germany
 Geographic Information Science
 Geographical Review
 Geographical Bulletin
 Geography
 Joel Sartore staff photographer, head of The Photo Ark project
 John Patric, noted writer for National Geographic during the 1930s and 1940s
 National Geographic Kids
 National Geographic Traveler
 The Geographical Journal
 The Photo Ark, a NatGeo project with the goal of photographing all species living in zoos and wildlife sanctuaries.
 The Professional Geographer
 Royal Geographical Society
 Vokrug sveta (Russian: Around the World)

References

Further reading
 Robert M. Poole, Explorers House: National Geographic and the World it Made, 2004; reprint, Penguin Press, 2006, 
 Stephanie L. Hawkins, American Iconographic: "National Geographic," Global Culture, and the Visual Imagination, University of Virginia Press, 2010, 264 pages. A scholarly study of the magazine's rise as a cultural institution that uses the letters of its founders and its readers; argues that National Geographic encouraged readers to question Western values and identify with others.
 Moseley, W.G. 2005. “Reflecting on National Geographic Magazine and Academic Geography: The September 2005 Special Issue on Africa” African Geographical Review. 24: 93–100.

External links

All the magazine's covers published since 1888 until the year 2000
Archived National Geographic magazines on the Internet Archive

1888 establishments in Washington, D.C.
Cultural magazines published in the United States
History magazines published in the United States
Magazines established in 1888
Magazines published in Washington, D.C.
Monthly magazines published in the United States
National Geographic Partners
National Geographic Society magazines
Science and technology magazines published in the United States